Zeyndanlu-ye Olya (also Romanized as Zeyndānlū-ye ‘Olyā and Zeynadānlū-ye ‘Olyā; also known as Zeydānlū-ye Bālā and Zīnadānlū-ye Bālā) is a village in Shahrestaneh Rural District, Now Khandan District, Dargaz County, Razavi Khorasan Province, Iran. At the 2006 census, its population was 168, in 46 families.

References 

Populated places in Dargaz County